Eric Wade Heitmann (born February 24, 1980) is a former center. He was drafted by the San Francisco 49ers in the 7th round (239th overall) of the 2002 NFL Draft.

College career
Heitmann graduated from Stanford University where he was voted first-team All-American following the 2001 season. He played guard for his entire tenure as a Cardinal, and he was a three time All-Pac-10 selection. Heitmann became the first Stanford offensive lineman voted All-American since Bob Whitfield in 1992.

Professional career
In 2002, Heitmann was the first rookie to start a game on the 49ers offensive line since 1987, when Harris Barton started at right tackle. He finished the 2002 season starting 12 games, including two playoff contests. He switched to center in the absence of regular center Jeremy Newberry. After an injury-plagued 2003 season, he started all 16 games in 2004.

Prior to the 2005 season, he worked to get stronger and more powerful under the tutelage of renowned strength coach Johnny Parker. His work paid off early in minicamps, and the 49ers signed him to a 4-year extension in June 2005. He started in all 16 games including 10 at right guard and six at center during the 2005 season.

Heitmann was converted to full-time center for the 2006 season.  However, on December 14, in a game against the Seattle Seahawks, Heitmann broke his right tibia with 6:13 left in the first quarter on a two-yard run by Frank Gore. Heitmann was down on the field for several minutes before being taken to the locker room on a cart. He consequently had surgery on his knee and finished the 2006 season on injured reserve after having started the first 14 games.  For his dedication and commitment, Heitmann was given the Bobb McKittrick award, named after the late 49ers offensive line coach.

In 2007, Heitmann had recovered from his injury and started all 16 games at center.

In 2020, Eric began writing and producing music in the epic, cinematic, and ambient genres. His compositions are, by design, ultra melodic and follow a hybrid orchestral style similar to film composers, Hans Zimmer, James Horner.

Eric was nominated for the 2021 Instrumental Song of the Year “Requiem,” and Instrumental Album of the Year “Ascent,” by One World Music, the leading internet radio station for modern classical and instrumental music. His collaboration "Dark Before Dawn" with Patrick Zelinski, was nominated for 2022 Classical Recording of the Year by the YYCA Awards in Canada.

References

External links
San Francisco 49ers bio
NFL.com Player Profile
SI.com Player Profile
Personal website

1980 births
Living people
American football centers
American football offensive guards
People from Katy, Texas
San Francisco 49ers players
Sportspeople from Harris County, Texas
Stanford Cardinal football players
Ed Block Courage Award recipients